This list of the prehistoric life of Missouri contains the various prehistoric life-forms whose fossilized remains have been reported from within the US state of Missouri.

Precambrian
The Paleobiology Database records no known occurrences of Precambrian fossils in Alabama.

Paleozoic

Selected Paleozoic taxa of Missouri

 †Achatella
 †Achistrum
 †Acutimitoceras – tentative report
  †Alethopteris
 †Alethopteris davreuxi
 †Alethopteris decurrens
 †Alethopteris grandini
 †Alethopteris serlii
 †Alethopteris valida
 †Amphiscapha
 † Ananias
 †Annularia
 †Annularia sphenophylloides
 †Annularia stellata
 †Anomphalus
 †Anthracoceras
  †Aphetoceras
 †Aphlebia
 †Archeognathus – type locality for genus
 †Artisia
 †Asterotheca
 †Athyris
 †Athyris fultonensis
 †Athyris lamellosa
 †Aulochiton – type locality for genus
 †Aviculopecten
 †Aviculopecten gradicosta
 †Avonia
  †Bellerophon
 †Bellerophon graphicus
 †Bellerophon jeffersonensis – type locality for species
 †Bembexia
 †Beyrichoceras
 †Bisatoceras
 †Bolbocephalus
 †Bumastus
 †Bumastus trentonensis
  †Calamites
 †Calamites carinatus
 †Calamites cistii
 †Calamites cruciatus
 †Calamites suckowii
 †Calyptaulax
 †Camarotoechia
 †Camarotoechia elegantula
 †Camarotoechia horsfordi
 †Camarotoechia tuta
 †Campbelloceras
 †Cardiocarpus
 †Cavusgnathus
  †Ceraurus
 †Chelodes
 †Chonetes
 †Chonetes geniculatus
 †Chonetes mesoloba
 †Chonetes ornatus
 †Clarkoceras
 †Cleiothyridina
 †Cleiothyridina incrassata
 †Cleiothyridina orbicularis
 †Cliftonia
 †Coenocystis
  †Composita
 †Composita elongata
 †Composita ovata
 †Composita subtilita
 †Composita tetralobata
 †Conocardium
 †Coolinia
 †Cordaicarpus
 †Cordaites
 †Cordaites crassinervis
 †Cordaites principalis
 †Cornuella – type locality for genus
 †Cornulites
 †Crania
 †Crepipora
 †Crepipora globulifera – type locality for species
 †Curtognathus
 †Cyclonema
 †Cyclopteris
 †Cyphaspis
  †Cyrtoceras
 †Cyrtolites
 †Dalmanites
 †Deckera
 † Della
 †Dicoelosia
  †Dinichthys
 †Domatoceras
 †Dorycordaites
 †Earlandia
 †Echinosphaerites
 †Edmondia
 †Ellesmeroceras
 Eocaudina
 †Eospirifer
 †Euomphalus
  †Fadenia
 †Favosites
 †Flexicalymene
 †Flexicalymene senaria
 †Gervillia
 †Glossina
 †Gnathodus
 †Gnathodus typicus
 †Gondolella
  †Halysites
 †Helcionopsis
 †Hemithecella – type locality for genus
 †Hindia
 †Holia – type locality for genus
 †Holopea
 †Hyolithes
 †Hypseloconus
 †Idiognathodus
 †Irvingella
  †Isotelus
 †Isotelus gigas
 †Isotelus maximus
 †Jeffersonia
 †Kendallina
 †Kirengella
 †Kirkella – type locality for genus
 †Lepidophyllum
 †Lingula
 †Liroceras
 †Matthevia
 †Maximites
 †Meristella
 †Meristina
  †Metacoceras
 †Murchisonia – tentative report
  †Naticopsis
 †Naticopsis judithae – type locality for species
 †Naticopsis marthaae – type locality for species
 †Naticopsis scintilla – type locality for species
 †Naticopsis wortheniana – type locality for species
 †Neospirifer
 †Neospirifer cameratus
 †Neospirifer goreii
 †Neospirifer latus
 †Neospirifer triplicatus
  †Neuropteris
 †Neuropteris caudata
 †Neuropteris flexuosa
 †Neuropteris heterophylla
 †Neuropteris ovata
 †Neuropteris rarinervis
 †Neuropteris scheuchzeri
 †Neuropteris tenuifolia
 Nucula
 †Oncagnostus
 †Oncagnostus tumidosus
  †Orodus
 †Orthoceras
 †Orygmaspis
 †Oulodus
 †Ozarkodina
 †Palaeoniscus
 †Paradycheia – type locality for genus
  †Pecopteris
 †Pecopteris unita
 †Phillipsia – tentative report
 †Phragmolites
 †Pinnularia
 †Platyceras
  †Pleurocystites
 †Plicochonetes
 †Polygnathus
 †Polygnathus communis
 †Prioniodus
 †Proetus
 †Pseudopolygnathus
 †Pteridosperm
 †Pterotheca
  †Ptyctodus
 †Quadratia
 †Receptaculites
 †Remopleurides
 †Robustum – type locality for genus
 †Robustum nodum – type locality for species
 †Rota
 †Shelbyoceras – type locality for genus
 †Sigillaria
 †Skenidioides
  Solemya
 †Spathognathodus
 †Sphaerocoryphe
 †Sphenophyllum
 †Sphenophyllum emarginatum
 †Sphenophyllum longifolium
 †Sphenophyllum majus
 †Sphenopteris
  †Spirifer
 †Spirifer marionensis
 †Spirifer opimus
 †Spirifer rockymontanus
 Spirorbis
 †Spyroceras
 †Strepsodiscus
 †Streptognathodus
 †Streptognathodus clarki – type locality for species
 †Strophomena
 †Strophomena incurvata
 †Subulites
 †Tarphyceras
  †Tricrepicephalus
 †Tryblidium
 †Vellamo
 †Whiteavesia
 †Wilkingia
 †Worthenia

Mesozoic

 †Acteon
  †Adocus
 †Aenona
 †Aenona eufaulensis
 †Albertosaurus
 †Ambigostrea
 †Ambigostrea tecticosta
 Amuletum
 †Anatimya
 †Anatimya anteradiata
 †Anchura
 †Anomia
 †Anomia ornata
 †Aphrodina
 †Aphrodina tippana
 Arrhoges
  †Baculites
 †Baculites tippahensis
 †Bellifusus
 †Belliscala
 †Bullopsis
 †Bullopsis cretacea
 Caestocorbula
 †Caestocorbula crassaplica
 †Caestocorbula crassiplica
 †Caestocorbula percompressa
 †Camptonectes
 †Camptonectes bubonis
 †Camptonectes hilgardi
 †Caveola
 Cerithiella
 †Cerithiella semirugatum
 †Clavipholas
 †Clavipholas pectorosa
  Cliona
 †Clisocolus
  Corbula
 Crassatella
 †Crassatella vadosa
 †Crenella
 †Crenella elegantula
 †Crenella serica
 Cucullaea
 †Cucullaea capax
 †Cymbophora
 †Cymbophora appressa
 †Cymbophora berryi
 †Cymella
 †Cymella bella
 †Cyprimeria
 †Cyprimeria alta
  †Discoscaphites
 †Discoscaphites iris
 †Drilluta
 †Eoacteon
 †Eoacteon linteus
 †Eoharpa
 †Eoharpa sinuosa
 †Eubaculites
 †Eubaculites carinatus
 †Eufistulana
 †Eufistulana ripleyana
 †Eufistulina
 †Euspira
 †Euspira rectilabrum
  †Exogyra
 †Exogyra costata
 †Fulgerca
 Fusinus
 †Fusinus macnairyensis – or unidentified related form
  Glycymeris
 †Glycymeris compressa
 †Glycymeris rotundata
 †Goniochasma – tentative report
 †Granocardium
 †Granocardium lowei
 †Granocardium tippananum
 †Granocardium tippanum
 †Gryphaeostrea
 †Gryphaeostrea vomer
 Gyrodes
 †Gyrodes spillmani
 †Gyrodes supraplicatus
 †Hamulus
 †Hamulus onyx
 †Hamulus squamosus
 †Helicaulax
 †Helicaulax formosa
 Juliacorbula
 †Juliacorbula monmouthensis
 †Legumen
 †Legumen ellipticum
 †Leptosolen
 †Leptosolen biplicata
 Lima
 †Lima pelagica
 Limatula
 †Limatula acutilineata
 †Linearis
 †Linearis metastriata
 †Liopeplum
 †Liopeplum rugosum
 †Liopistha
 †Liopistha protexta
 †Liothyris
 †Lowenstamia
 †Lycettia
 †Lycettia tippana
 †Lycettia tippanus
 Malletia
 †Malletia longfrons
 †Malletia longifrons
 †Micrabacia
 †Morea
 †Morea transenna
  †Mosasaurus
 †Mosasaurus hoffmanni
 †Naomichelys
 †Napulus
 †Napulus octoliratus
 †Nemocardium
 †Nemocardium fragile
 †Nemodon
 †Nemodon eufalensis
 †Nemodon eufaulensis
  Nucula
 †Nucula camia
 †Nucula percrassa
 Nuculana
 †Nuculana whitfieldi
 †Opertochasma
 †Paladmete
 †Paladmete cancellaria
 Panopea
 †Panopea monmouthensis
 †Parmicorbula
 †Parmicorbula percompressa
 †Parrosaurus – type locality for genus
 †Parrosaurus missouriensis
  Pholadomya
 †Pholadomya occidentalis
  †Pinna
 †Pinna laqueata
 †Pleuriocardia
 †Praeleda
 †Praeleda compar
 †Protocardia
 †Protocardia spillmani
 Pseudomalaxis
 †Pseudomalaxis pateriformis
  †Pterotrigonia
 †Pterotrigonia angulicostata
 †Pterotrigonia eufalensis
 †Pterotrigonia eufaulensis
 †Pyropsis
 †Scambula
 †Scambula perplana
  †Scaphites
  Serpula
 Striarca
 †Striarca cuneata
 †Striarca saffordi
 †Syncyclonema
 †Syncyclonema simplicius
  Tellina
 †Tellinimera
 †Tellinimera buboana
 †Tenea
 †Tenea parilis
 †Tenuipteria
 †Tenuipteria argentea
 †Tenuipteria argenteus
  Trachycardium
 †Trobus
 †Trobus buboanus
  Turritella
 †Turritella bilira
 †Turritella chalybeatensis
 †Turritella tippana
 †Turritella vertebroides
 †Unicardium
 †Urceolabrum
 †Urceolabrum tuberculatum
 †Veniella
 †Veniella conradi
 †Volutomorpha
 †Weeksia

Cenozoic

 Alligator
  †Arctodus
 †Arctodus simus
 Bison
 †Bootherium
 Bufo
 †Bufo woodhousei
  †Camelops
 Canis
 †Canis dirus
 †Canis latrans
 Cnemidophorus
 †Cnemidophorus sexlineatus
 Crotalus
 †Crotalus horridus
 Dasypus
 †Dasypus bellus
 Elaphe
 †Elaphe vulpina
 Equus
 †Equus complicatus
 Geomys
 Lepus
 †Lepus americanus
 †Mammut
  †Mammut americanum
 †Mammuthus
 Marmota
  †Megalonyx
 †Megalonyx jeffersonii – or unidentified comparable form
 Microtus
 †Microtus ochrogaster – or unidentified comparable form
 †Microtus pennsylvanicus
 †Mylohyus
 Neotoma
 †Neotoma floridana
 Nerodia
 †Nerodia sipedon
 Ochrotomys
 †Ochrotomys nuttalli – or unidentified comparable form
 Odocoileus
 †Odocoileus virginianus
 Panthera
  †Panthera onca
 †Platygonus
 †Platygonus compressus
 Procyon
 †Procyon lotor
 Puma
 †Puma concolor – or unidentified comparable form
 †Rana
 †Rana pipiens
 Sceloporus
 †Sceloporus undulatus
 Sciurus
  †Smilodon
 Spermophilus
 Spilogale
 †Spilogale putorius – or unidentified comparable form
 Sylvilagus
 †Sylvilagus aquaticus
 Synaptomys
 †Synaptomys cooperi
 †Tanupolama
 †Tanupolama parvus – type locality for species
  Tapirus
 Urocyon

References
 

Missouri